General elections were held in Saint Kitts and Nevis on 6 March 2000. The result was a victory for the Saint Kitts and Nevis Labour Party, which won eight of the eleven directly-elected seats. Voter turnout was 64.2%.

Results

References

Saint Kitts
Elections in Saint Kitts and Nevis
General